Thomas Lambert (died 1604), of Winchester, Hampshire, was an English politician.

Lambert was a Member of Parliament for Wareham in 1586, during the reign of Elizabeth I of England.

References

16th-century births
1604 deaths
Politicians from Winchester
English MPs 1586–1587